EQI may refer to:

 Educational Quality Inspection, as used by Independent Schools Inspectorate in England 
 Education Queensland International, program by Department of Education (Queensland) for international students to study in Queensland, example Mount Gravatt State High School
 EQ-i, Emotional Quotient inventory, tool used to assess emotional intelligence
 Equity Index (New Zealand)
 European Quality of Government Index, as used by Quality of Government Institute